Snowfall in Taipei is a 2010 Chinese-Hong Kong-Taiwanese-Japanese romance film directed by Huo Jianqi and starring Chen Bolin, Tong Yao, Morning Tzu-Yi Mo, and Tony Yang. The film is based on the Japanese novel of the same name by Chikayo Tashiro. The film premiered in Japan on February 20, 2010.

Plot
Xiao Mo (Chen Bolin) is a young man living in Jingtong, an ancient town in Pingxi District, New Taipei City, Taiwan. One day, a Shandongese pop singer May (Tong Yao) is announced missing in Taipei, but soon appears in Xiao Mo's town. With a voice problem and desperate to hide herself, she seeks help from Xiao Mo, who offers her a place to stay, a job in a local restaurant, and takes her to a doctor for treatment. As time passes by, Xiao Mo finds himself in love with May, however, May loves Ah Lei, who is her producer.

Cast
 Chen Bolin as Xiao Mo
 Yue-Tang Tommy Wang as young Xiao Mo
 Tong Yao as May, a singer from Qingdao, Shandong
 Morning Tzu-Yi Mo as Jack
 Tony Yang as Ah Lei, May's love interest and producer.
 Teresa Daley as Wen Wen
 Janel Tsai as Lisa
 Wang Juan as Restaurant Proprietress
 Fan Zhuhua as the landlady
 Shih-Chieh King as Master Ma 
 Chen Yiting as Xiao Mo's mother

Soundtrack

Production
This film was shot entirely on location in Taipei and Jingtong.

Release
Snowfall in Taipei was released in Japan on February 20, 2010, in Taiwan on September 15, 2011 and in mainland China on April 1, 2012.

Reception
Douban gave the film 5.5 out of 10.

Box office
Snowfall in Taipei grossed 2.07 million yuan in Chinese box office.

Accolades

References

External links
 
 
 

2010 films
Chinese romance films
Hong Kong romance films
Taiwanese romance films
Japanese romance films
Films shot in Taiwan
Films set in Taiwan
2010 romance films
2010s English-language films
2010s Mandarin-language films
2010s Japanese films
2010s Hong Kong films